The Peaceful Air of the West is a 1990 Italian comedy film directed by Silvio Soldini.

Cast 
 Fabrizio Bentivoglio: Cesare
 Patrizia Piccinini: Veronica
 Antonella Fattori: Irene
 Ivano Marescotti: Tobia
 Silli Togni: Clara
 Roberto Accornero: Mario

References

External links

1990 films
Italian comedy films
1990 comedy films
Films directed by Silvio Soldini
1990s Italian films